National anthem of Macau may refer to:

 A Portuguesa, the national anthem of Portuguese Macau 
 March of the Volunteers, the national anthem of China including the Macau Special Administrative Region